Arthur Haigh (birth unknown – death unknown) was an English professional rugby league footballer who played in the 1920s and 1930s.

Playing career
Arthur Haigh was born in Methley, Leeds or Featherstone, Wakefield, West Riding of Yorkshire, England.

Playing career
Haigh made his début for Featherstone Rovers on Saturday 27 August 1921, and he played his last match for Featherstone Rovers during the 1929–30 season.

County Cup Final appearances
Haigh played right-, i.e. number 12, in Featherstone Rovers' 0-5 defeat by Leeds in the 1928 Yorkshire County Cup Final during the 1928–29 season at Belle Vue, Wakefield on Saturday 24 November 1928.

Testimonial match
Haigh's benefit season at Featherstone Rovers, shared with Jimmy Williams, took place during the 1928–29 season.

References

External links

Search for "Haigh" at rugbyleagueproject.org

English rugby league players
Featherstone Rovers players
Place of death missing
Rugby league second-rows
Year of birth missing
Year of death missing